The Lindenwood Lady Lions women represented Lindenwood University in CHA women's ice hockey during the 2016-17 NCAA Division I women's ice hockey season.

Offseason

April 5: Nicole Hensley, Class of 2016, was a key member of the gold medal Team USA 2016 IIHF. During the tournament, Hensley posted a shutout against Russia. During the 2016-17 season, Hensley returned to Lindenwood in the capacity of Assistant Coach.  She is the NCAA all-time saves leader, with 4,094 saves in net for the Lady Lions.

Recruiting

Roster

2016–17 Lady Lions

Schedule

|-
!colspan=12 style=" "| Regular Season

|-
!colspan=12 style=" "|CHA Tournament

Awards and honors

Jolene deBruyne, CHA Goaltender of the Month, November, 2016 
Courtney Ganske D, 2016-17 All-CHA Rookie Team

References

Lindenwood
Lindenwood Lions women's ice hockey seasons
Lindenwood
Lindenwood